Clarence Elong Mansul (1940-2 March 1999) was a Malaysian politician from BERJAYA. He was the Deputy Minister of Energy, Telecommunications and Posts from 1981 to 1983. He was also the Member of Parliament for Penampang from 1978 to 1986 and Member of Sabah State Legislative Assembly for Tamparuli from 1983 to 1985.

Politics 
Clarence was once a Deputy Chairman of the Kadazan Cultural Association (now today known as the Kadazandusun Cultural Association).

Election result

Health and death 
He died on 2 March 1999, aged 59, after suffering a heart failure in Hospital Kuala Lumpur whilst campaigning for the 1999 Sabah state election as well as vacationing simultaneously with his family in Kuala Lumpur during that period and was survived by his widow, Datin Annie Kong (born 1948), eight children and several grandchildren as well as an elderly 77-year-old mother, Bridget Boluin Molijiu (1922–2013), who outlived him 14 years later at the ripe old age of 91.

Honours 
  :
  Commander of the Order of Kinabalu (PGDK) - Datuk

References 

20th-century Malaysian politicians
People from Sabah
Sabah People's United Front politicians
Kadazan-Dusun people
Members of the Dewan Rakyat
Malaysian Roman Catholics
Members of the Sabah State Legislative Assembly
1940 births
1999 deaths
Commanders of the Order of Kinabalu